Irinel Ioan Ionescu (born 25 December 1978) is a Romanian former footballer who played as a centre back mainly for Politehnica Iași, but also for teams such as Metalul Plopeni, CSM Focșani or Cetatea Suceava, among others.

After retirement, Ionescu started a career as a football manager and worked for Știința Miroslava and Flacăra Erbiceni.

Honours

Player
Politehnica Iași
Divizia B: Winner (1) 2003–04

Rapid Dumești
Liga IV – Iași County: Winner (1) 2009–10

Flacăra Erbiceni
Liga V – Iași County: Winner (1) 2015–16

Manager
Flacăra Erbiceni
Liga V – Iași County: Winner (1) 2015–16

Știința Miroslava
Liga III: Winner (1) 2016–17

References

External links
 
 

1978 births
Living people
Sportspeople from Iași
Romanian footballers
Association football defenders
Liga I players
Liga II players
FC Politehnica Iași (1945) players
CSO Plopeni players
CSM Focșani players
Romanian football managers
CS Știința Miroslava managers